Steinmeyer is a surname. Notable people with the surname include:

Elias von Steinmeyer (1848–1922), German philologist
Ferdinand Steinmeyer (1720–1786), German Jesuit missionary in Northern America
Jim Steinmeyer (born 1958), American magic consultant

See also
Frank-Walter Steinmeier (born 1956), German politician

German-language surnames